Which? is a United Kingdom brand name that promotes informed consumer choice in the purchase of goods and services by testing products, highlighting inferior products or services, raising awareness of consumer rights, and offering independent advice. The brand name is used by the Consumers' Association, a registered charity and company limited by guarantee that owns several businesses, including Which? Financial Services Limited (Which? Mortgage Advisers), Which? Legal Limited and Which? Limited, which publishes the Which? Papers.

The vast majority of the association's income comes from the profit it makes on its trading businesses, for instance subscriptions to Which? magazine, which are donated to the campaigning part of the organisation to fund advocacy activity and inform the public about consumer issues. Which? magazine maintains its independence by not accepting advertising, and the organisation receives no government funding. The Consumers' Association is the largest consumer organisation in the UK, with over 573,000 subscribers to its magazine.

Until 2006, the association used prize draws similar to those of Reader's Digest to attract subscribers, but following criticism they were discontinued. The Association attracts subscribers to its publications with free mini-guides and trial offers.

History and background
The organisation was set up in 1957 
as a response to the changing values and concerns of the post-war era, at a time of rapid changes in product markets and consumer behaviour – and a corresponding growth in sharp trading practices. To combat this, Michael Young, research director for the Labour Party, proposed setting up a 'Consumer Advisory Service' to be considered for the party's 1950 manifesto, only to be rejected by Harold Wilson.

Encouraged by the efforts of Dorothy Bruchholz Goodman, of the United States, and her British husband Raymond J. Goodman, Young continued to push the idea and in October 1957 the first Which? magazine was published from a converted garage in Bethnal Green. Its central aim was to improve the standard of goods and services available to the public in the UK. Under the editorship of Eirlys Roberts, the publication started as a small 32-page magazine that included reports on electric kettles, sunglasses, aspirin, cake-mixes, scouring powders, no-iron cottons and British cars.

By 1959, membership reached 150,000 and a membership services office in Hertford. In 1960, Which? helped to found the International Organisation of Consumer Unions, later Consumers International. In 1962, coverage expanded with the launch of the first quarterly Which? car supplement, which becomes Motoring Which? in 1965, followed by Money Which? in 1968.

In 1970, Which? bought a set of buildings in Harpenden, Hertfordshire, to set up labs to test products including domestic appliances, DIY equipment, and consumer electronics. Previously, the work had been contracted out. The 1970s saw Which? taking a greater campaigning role, and it began to adopt a more aggressive stance on issues such as lead poisoning and aircraft noise. In 1971, for example, Which? published the first league table on the tar and nicotine content of cigarettes. In 1973, Maurice Healy succeeded Eirlys Roberts as editor, and became editor-in-chief for all the Which? magazines, before he left in 1977 to join the National Consumer Council.

The organisation also dabbled in high street consumer advice centres during the 1970s. More than 120 such centres were operating in 1977–78, many of them funded by local councils. The centres closed as funding was withdrawn by the government in 1980.

Which? continued campaigning on consumer safety issues, with its car safety test results strengthening calls to legislate car manufacturers to fit seat belts in all new cars, helping to make it compulsory to Clunk Click Every Trip in 1983. In 1992, Which? launched another satellite publication, this one aimed at youngsters aged 11–15, called Check It Out!, but it failed to take off and closed in June 1994. In 1995 testing facilities were moved to Milton Keynes where they remained until 2002, when the majority of the Which? testing activities were contracted out. Which? Online, the first incarnation of the Which? website, was launched in 1996 which incorporated its own ISP, email and content in addition to the Which Online Forum - an area accessible to members which offered unfettered access to members of the senior management within Which? including the Directors.

The trading organisation was rebranded as Which? in 2004 and this is the brand promoted to the general public. However the charity the Consumers' Association continues to own Which? Ltd and retains its own name.

Following the deregulation of the gas and electricity industry, Which? launched a free online energy comparison service called Switch with Which? in 2005, to compare energy tariffs. The service was awarded Energywatch Confidence Code accreditation in 2006.

In the 2010 Superbrands index, Which? ranked fifth in the "Media — Newspapers and Magazines" category and 256th overall.

Product testing
Which? carries out systematic testing of consumer products and financial services, the results of which are published in reports in Which? magazine and on the Which? website. Tests are carried out on goods, services, and suppliers. Testing covers reliability, performance, safety, energy efficiency and value-for-money, as relevant in different cases. Top-rated products are awarded the Which? 'Best Buy' status logo, an accreditation recognised by industry and consumers. Which? first used the phrase in its second magazine edition in 1958, to describe Boots 365 talcum powder. Conversely, the worst-performing products are labelled 'Don't Buys'.

Which? awards
The Which? Awards is an annual event to 'celebrate the UK's best products and services, from cars and restaurants to supermarkets and financial services'.

Award winners are selected by Which? staff, based on test findings and feedback from Which? members throughout the year.

Unusual test subjects
As well as the usual household products, Which? has tested things such as:

 Bird seed for budgerigars in 1959
 Contraceptives in 1963
 Paper dresses in 1967
 Pets in 1977

Publications
Most Which? publications are supplied only to subscribers, and are not on general sale. Which? magazine, started in 1957, is the organisation's principal publication. The magazine reports on consumer issues of the day, publishes product testing results and findings of original research and investigations.

The magazine also discusses trading which it believes goes against the interests of consumers. Examples of such discussions include an exposé into solar panel heating installation companies, an undercover enquiry with the RNID revealing serious problems at shops selling hearing aids and an investigation into electronics shop staffs' knowledge of the products that they sell.

Other publications include Which? Travel, Which? Car, Which? Money, Which? Computing and Which? Gardening.

Finances

The Consumer's Association experienced sharply increased income up to 2014, and since then has shown steady figures.

Policy, consultation and parliamentary lobbying
Which? regularly briefs and lobbies MPs, Peers, AMs, MLAs, MSPs and MEPs on national, European and international consumer issues. For example, Which? successfully lobbied to put an end to the '65-day rule' that allowed energy companies to wait 65 days before informing their customers of a price change.

Following the creation of the Scottish parliament in 1999, in January 2002 Which? established an office in Edinburgh. Which? also works with the European Consumers' Association (BEUC) which brings together over forty consumer organisations from across Europe to represent common consumer interests within the EU institutions.

Legal powers

Super-complaints
The Consumers' Association has the power under The Enterprise Act 2002 to take action on behalf of consumers, including the ability to bring a super-complaint to the Financial Conduct Authority (FCA). Which? is one of five organisations able to issue a super-complaint. The Consumers' Association was among the first groups granted these new powers, and was among the first to have them regranted when the Office of Fair Trading (OFT) was replaced by the FCA. A super-complaint can be made about any market that is not working properly for consumers. As consumers are not in the position to overcome the issue themselves, Which? can issue a super-complaint on consumers' behalf. The FCA has 90 days in which to assess the complaint and decide what to do about it. It can reject the complaint in part or as a whole, it can launch a market investigation, take action under competition law or consumer law, or refer the market to the Competition and Markets Authority for further investigation.

Which? made its first super complaint about private dentistry in 2001. It later made complaints about care homes, the Northern Ireland banking sector and credit card interest calculation methods. In March 2011 it made a super complaint about unfair debit and credit card payment surcharges made by retailers. The OFT upheld the super-complaint in June 2011.

In September 2016 Which? filed a super complaint against banks that routinely refuse to reimburse victims who have been scammed into transferring money into fraudsters’ accounts.
Which? said banks should "shoulder more responsibility" for such fraud, much as they already reimburse customers who lose money through scams involving fraudulent account activity, or debit or credit cards.
According to official industry data, such scams increased by 53% in a year: from 660,308 cases in the first half of 2015 to 1,007,094 in the first half of 2016. Which? said: "Consumers can only protect themselves so far. People cannot be expected to detect complex scams pressuring them to transfer money immediately, or lookalike bills from their solicitor or builder" that are copied from genuine bills but have had the bank account number and sort code changed.

In 2018 Which? was accused by members of its long-standing email service - which.net - of abandoning them by abruptly announcing cancellation of a service they'd used for 22 years. One member stated "Even if this were a commercial company the way it’s been done is appalling, but for it to be a charity that professes to protect consumers - it's a travesty and a betrayal of those members who trusted Which? in a way no one would trust a commercial entity."

Legal action against rogue traders
In 2005 Which? was granted legal powers to bring rogue traders to account for their actions under Part 8 of the Enterprise Act 2002.

Unfair contract terms
Which? has statutory powers under the Unfair Terms in Consumer Contracts Regulations 1999. Which? can seek an injunction to restrain the use of an unfair contract term by a trader against consumers.

Competition Appeals Tribunal
Which? is one of the 'specified bodies' who, under the Enterprise and Competition Acts, may bring proceedings before the Competition Appeals Tribunal (CAT) on behalf of two or more consumers for damages. Which? was granted specified body status on 1 October 2005 by the Ministers of the Department of Trade and Industry. In April 2007 Which? launched its first representative action on behalf of consumers unlawfully overcharged for football shirts due to price fixing.

Organisational structure
The Consumers’ Association owns an operational company Which? Ltd who report to the Council of Trustees. The Board of Which? Ltd is made up primarily of co-opted members, members of Which? staff and some representative[s] from the Consumers' Association Council.

The Consumers' Association is subject to both the Companies Act 2006 and to charity requirements. Since 2012 it is governed by a Council of nine elected and up-to six co-opted members who can serve a maximum of 9 years at any one time.

Only Ordinary members of the Consumers' Association can stand for the council. Any subscriber can become a member of the Consumers' Association by agreeing to guarantee the debts of the Association to a maximum of 50p. It also means they will receive Annual Accounts, AGM Minutes, and be able to vote on Resolutions that change the governing Articles.

None of the council, or Board members is paid [other than the employees], although they are entitled to claim reasonable expenses. Sam Younger became Chairman on 1 January 2020, replacing Tim Gardam who had held the role since 2015.

References

Further reading

 Joyce Epstein  (1989)  : The Early Days of Consumers` Association - Interviews with CA`s Founders , RICA - RESEARCH INSTITUTE FOR CONSUMER AFFAIRS

Willy van Ryckeghem (2005) : L`Histoire de Test-Achats Editions Racine, Brussels

External links
 

Consumer organisations in the United Kingdom
Magazines published in the United Kingdom
British review websites
Consumer magazines
Advertising-free magazines
Monthly magazines published in the United Kingdom
Magazines established in 1957
Members of Consumers International
1957 establishments in the United Kingdom